Robert Bosch Jr. (29 January 1928 in Stuttgart – 2 August 2004 in Gerlingen) was the son of Robert Bosch and owned together with his sister, Eva Madelung, 8% of Robert Bosch GmbH.

He studied electrical engineering in Stuttgart. He was married to Irmgard von Graevenitz.  From 1971 to 1978 he was a member of the supervisory board.

External links
Forbes.com: Forbes World's Richest People  Dead Link
Robert Bosch der Jüngere gestorben
 Biography in Muzinger

German industrialists
German billionaires
1928 births
2004 deaths
Businesspeople from Stuttgart
20th-century German businesspeople
21st-century German businesspeople